Francisco Robles García (5 May 1811 – 7 March 1893) was President of Ecuador from 16 October 1856 to 31 August 1859. During his term, war broke out with Peru and Ecuador was defeated.

References

FRANCISCO ROBLES GARCIA . diccionariobiograficoecuador.com
 Official Website of the Ecuadorian Government about the country President's History

1811 births
1893 deaths
Presidents of Ecuador
People from Guayaquil
19th-century Ecuadorian people